Papagiannis (before 1928: Ποπόζιανη - Popoziani, alternative old name: Βακούφκιοϊ - Vakoufkioi; Macedonian and Bulgarian: Пополжани, Popolžani), is a village in the Florina regional unit, Western Macedonia, Greece.

Demographics
The Greek census (1920) recorded 750 people in Popoziani. In 1928, the Greek census recorded 930 village inhabitants. Following the Greek-Turkish population exchange, in 1928 there were 7 refugee families (31 people) in the village. 

Papagiannis had 915 inhabitants in 1981. In fieldwork done by Riki Van Boeschoten in late 1993, Papagiannis was populated by Slavophones. The Macedonian language was spoken in the village by people over 30 in public and private settings. Children understood the language, but mostly did not use it. 

According to the 2011 census the village had 581 inhabitants.

Notable people

Trayan Stelovski (1920–1946) – fighter and activist of the National Liberation Front (NOF), perished with 4 others in a battle against the Greek army on 2 July 1946.
Zhivko Popov (d. 1946) – fighter and activist of NOF, during the Greek Civil War he was betrayed and encircled by the Greek army, losing his life in a burning barn.

References

Populated places in Florina (regional unit)